The Syed Family Xmas Eve Game Night is a short comedy film, directed by Fawzia Mirza, and released in 2021. The film is written by and stars Kausar Mohammed as Noor, a queer Muslim woman who brings her Puerto Rican partner Luz (Vico Ortiz) home to a family gathering for the first time.

The cast also includes Meera Rohit Kumbhani, Pia Shah and D'Lo.

The film was written by Mohammed, partially based on her own life. It premiered at the 2021 Toronto International Film Festival.

The film was named to TIFF's annual year-end Canada's Top Ten list for 2021.

References

External links
 

2021 films
2021 short films
2021 LGBT-related films
American LGBT-related short films
Canadian comedy short films
Canadian LGBT-related short films
2020s English-language films
2020s Canadian films
2020s American films